Sword Stained with Royal Blood is a Hong Kong television series adapted from Louis Cha's novel of the same title. It was first broadcast on CTV in Hong Kong in 1977.

Cast
 Note: Some of the characters' names are in Cantonese romanisation.

 Chan Keung as Yuen Sing-chi
 Wen Hsueh-erh as Wan Ching-ching
 Ann Lee as Ah-kau / Princess Cheung-ping
 Dean Shek as Ha Suet-yee
 Wu Yan-yan as Wan Yee
 Yuen Qiu as Ho Tit-sau
 Bonnie Ngai as Ho Hung-yeuk
 Lai See-man as Kiu Yuen-yee
 Suen Kwai-hing as Kiu Kung-lai
 Chan Fei-lung as Wan Fong-tat
 Kam Kong as Wan Fong-yee
 Bak Man-biu as Wan Fong-san
 Lau Kong as Wong Tsan
 Yeung Chak-lam as Muk Yan-ching
 Cheung Man-ting as Kwai Yee-neung

External links

1970s Hong Kong television series
1977 Hong Kong television series debuts
1977 Hong Kong television series endings
Works based on Sword Stained with Royal Blood
Hong Kong wuxia television series
Television series set in the Ming dynasty
Cantonese-language television shows
Television shows based on works by Jin Yong
Television series set in the 17th century